Minaker is a surname. Notable people with the surname include:

 George Minaker (1937–2012), Canadian politician
 Marilynn Minaker (born 1949), Canadian former gymnast